The Northwest Line (Danish: Nordvestbanen), also referred to as the Kalundborg Line (Danish: Kalundborgbanen),  is a  long, state-owned single track passenger railway line between Roskilde and Kalundborg in the western part of the island of Zealand. The railway is owned by Banedanmark and the service is operated by DSB between Copenhagen Central Station and Kalundborg.

History
The railway was established as a result of the Railway Act of 29. February 1869. The rail line opened on 30 December 1874.

Stations

References

Nordvestbanen på Sjælland (DSB), danskejernbaner.dk

Railway lines in Denmark
Transport in Holbæk Municipality
Transport in Roskilde Municipality
Rail transport in Region Zealand
Railway lines opened in 1874
1874 establishments in Denmark